Shogo Nakamura (born 16 September 1992) is a Japanese long-distance runner.

He qualified for the marathon at the 2020 Summer Olympics by winning the 2019  with a time of 2:11:28, closely beating out Yuma Hattori and national record holder Suguru Osako.

Personal bests
Outdoor
5000 metres – 	13:38.93 (Osaka 2016)
10000 metres – 28:05.79 (Nobeoka 2013)
Half marathon – 1:01:53 (Yamaguchi 2016)
Marathon – 2:08:16 (Berlin 2018)

References

1992 births
Living people
Japanese male long-distance runners
People from Yokkaichi
Universiade medalists in athletics (track and field)
Medalists at the 2013 Summer Universiade
Universiade silver medalists for Japan
Universiade bronze medalists for Japan
Komazawa University alumni
Olympic athletes of Japan
Athletes (track and field) at the 2020 Summer Olympics
21st-century Japanese people